Grosch may refer to:
 Herb Grosch (1918–2010), Canadian-American computer scientist
 Grosch's law, an observation about computer performance
 Mária Grosch (born 1954), Hungarian chess player
 Mathieu Grosch (born 1950), Belgian politician
 Mike Leon Grosch (born 1976), German singer
 Christian Heinrich Grosch (1801-1865), Norwegian architect

See also
 Groschen, a coin
Grolsch, similar name